The Aeropod is a mixed development projects comprising hotel, a retail mall, retail offices, residential suites, corporate offices and green parks in Tanjung Aru, Kota Kinabalu, Sabah, Malaysia. The projects are being done in five stages. The projects also include a provision for light rail transit (LRT) in the Kota Kinabalu metropolitan, to improve the already available rail station in Tanjung Aru.

References 

Shopping malls in Sabah